The 1948 United States presidential election was the 41st quadrennial presidential election. It was held on Tuesday, November 2, 1948. In one of the greatest election upsets in American history, incumbent President Harry S. Truman, the Democratic nominee, defeated heavily-favored Republican Governor Thomas E. Dewey, winning re-election in a four-way contest. Truman was the third president to ascend to the presidency upon his predecessor’s death and be elected to a full term.

Truman had ascended to the presidency in April 1945 after the death of Franklin D. Roosevelt. Defeating attempts to drop him from the ticket, Truman won the presidential nomination at the 1948 Democratic National Convention. The Democratic  convention's civil rights plank caused a walk-out by several Southern delegates, who launched a third-party "Dixiecrat" ticket led by Governor Strom Thurmond of South Carolina. The Dixiecrats hoped to win enough electoral votes to force a contingent election in the House of Representatives, where they could extract concessions from either Dewey or Truman in exchange for their support. Truman also faced a challenge from his party in the form of former Vice President Henry A. Wallace, who launched the Progressive Party and challenged Truman's confrontational Cold War policies. Dewey, who was the leader of his party's liberal eastern wing and had been the 1944 Republican presidential nominee, defeated Senator Robert A. Taft and other challengers at the 1948 Republican National Convention. This was the first election to have primary and general election debates with Dewey debating Harold Stassen in the Republican primary while Norman Thomas debated Farrell Dobbs in the general election.

Truman's feisty campaign style energized his base of traditional Democrats, consisting of most of the white South, as well as labor unions, and Catholic and Jewish voters; he also fared surprisingly well with Midwestern farmers. Dewey ran a low-risk campaign and largely avoided directly criticizing Truman. With the three-way split in the Democratic Party, and with Truman's low approval ratings, Truman was widely considered to be the underdog in the race, and virtually every prediction (with or without public opinion polls) indicated that Dewey would win the election. Defying these predictions, Truman won the election with 303 electoral votes to Dewey's 189. Truman also won 49.6% of the popular vote compared to Dewey's 45.1%, while the third-party candidacies of Thurmond and Wallace each won less than 3% of the popular vote, with Thurmond carrying four southern states. Truman's surprise victory was the fifth consecutive presidential win for the Democratic Party, the longest winning streak for the Democrats, and the longest for either party since the 1880 election. 

With simultaneous success in the 1948 congressional elections, the Democrats regained control of both houses of Congress, which they had lost in 1946. Thus, Truman's election confirmed the Democratic Party's status as the nation's majority party. This was the last presidential election before the ratification of the Twenty-second Amendment in 1951, limiting the number of times a person may be elected president.

Nominations

Democratic Party nomination 

On July 12, the Democratic National Convention convened in Philadelphia in the same arena where the Republicans had met a few weeks earlier. Spirits were low; the Republicans had taken control of both houses of the United States Congress and a majority of state governorships during the 1946 mid-term elections, and the public opinion polls showed Truman trailing Republican nominee Dewey, sometimes by double digits. Furthermore, some liberal Democrats had joined Henry A. Wallace's new Progressive Party, and party leaders feared that Wallace would take enough votes from Truman to give the large Northern and Midwestern states to the Republicans. Conservatives dominated the party in the South, and they were angered by the growing voice of labor unions and black voters in the party outside the South. The hope that Truman would reverse course faded when he vetoed the Taft-Hartley Law, which sought to reduce the power of labor unions. Congress voted to override Truman's veto, and the Taft-Hartley Law went into effect on June 23, 1947. Finally, Truman's appointment of a liberal civil rights commission convinced Southern conservatives that to re-establish their voice they had to threaten third-party action to defeat Truman in 1948. Truman was aware of his unpopularity. In July 1947, he privately offered to be Eisenhower's running mate on the Democratic ticket if MacArthur won the Republican nomination, an offer which Eisenhower declined. Truman's offer to Eisenhower did not become public knowledge during the campaign.

As a result of Truman's low standing in the polls, several Democratic party bosses began working to "dump" Truman and nominate a more popular candidate. Among the leaders of this movement were Jacob Arvey, the head of the powerful Cook County (Chicago) Democratic organization; Frank Hague, the boss of New Jersey; James Roosevelt, the eldest son of former President Franklin D. Roosevelt; and liberal Senator Claude Pepper from Florida. The rebels hoped to draft Eisenhower as the Democratic presidential candidate. On July 10, Eisenhower officially refused to be a candidate. There was then an attempt to put forward Supreme Court Justice William O. Douglas, but Douglas also declared that he would not be a presidential candidate. Finally, Senator Pepper declared his intention to challenge Truman for the presidential nomination. His candidacy collapsed when the liberal Americans for Democratic Action and the Congress of Industrial Organizations withheld their support, partly due to concerns over Pepper's attacks on Truman's foreign policy decisions regarding the Soviet Union. As a result of the refusal by most of the dump-Truman delegates to support him, Pepper withdrew his candidacy for the nomination on July 16. Lacking a candidate acceptable to all sides, the leaders of the dump-Truman movement reluctantly agreed to support Truman for the nomination.

Democratic Convention 
At the Democratic Convention, Truman initially proposed a civil rights plank to the party platform that moderated the strong vocal support for civil rights that he had expressed at the NAACP convention in 1947, and to Congress in February 1948. This proposal disappointed Northern and Western liberals who wanted more swift and sweeping reforms in civil rights, but it also failed to placate Southern conservatives, and both sides decided to present their own amendments and proposals to Truman's civil rights plank. Former Texas Governor Dan Moody proposed a plank that supported the status quo of states' rights; a similar but shorter proposal was made by Cecil Sims of the Tennessee delegation. On the liberal side, Wisconsin Representative Andrew Biemiller proposed a strong civil rights plank which was more explicit and direct in its language than Truman's convention proposal. Minneapolis Mayor Hubert Humphrey led the support for the Biemiller plank. In his speech to the convention, Humphrey memorably stated that "the time has come for the Democratic Party to get out of the shadow of states' rights and walk forthrightly into the bright sunshine of human rights!"

Truman and his staff knew it was highly likely that any civil rights plank would lead to Southern delegates staging a walk-out in protest, but Truman believed that civil rights was an important moral cause and ultimately abandoned his advisers' attempts to "soften the approach" with the moderate plank; so the President supported and defended the "Crackpot" Biemiller plank, which passed by 651.5 votes to 582.5. It also received strong support from many of the big-city party bosses, most of whom felt that the civil rights platform would encourage the growing black population in their cities to vote for the Democrats. The passage of the civil rights platform caused some three dozen Southern delegates, led by South Carolina Governor Strom Thurmond, to walk out of the convention. The Southern delegates who remained nominated Senator Richard Russell Jr. from Georgia for the Democratic nomination as a rebuke to Truman. Nonetheless, 947 Democratic delegates voted for Truman as the Democratic nominee, while Russell received only 266 votes, all from the South. Truman's first choice for his running mate was Supreme Court Justice William O. Douglas, hoping that it might make the ticket more appealing to liberals. Douglas refused the nomination. Needing an alternative, Truman then selected Senator Alben W. Barkley from Kentucky, who had delivered the convention's keynote address, as his running mate, and Barkley was nominated by acclamation.

Truman gave a fighting acceptance speech, he stated that "Senator Barkley and I will win this election and make the Republicans like it - don't you forget it!... We will do that because they are wrong and we are right." He claimed that the Republican Party had, "ever since its inception...been under the control of special privilege; and they have completely proved it in the Eightieth Congress." At the end of the speech, the "delegates rose to their feet and cheered loudly for two minutes...for a moment Truman had created the illusion – few regarded it as more than an illusion – that the Democrats had a fighting chance in November."

Republican Party nomination 

For both Republicans and Democrats, there were movements of support for General Dwight D. Eisenhower, the most popular general of World War II and a favorite in the polls. Unlike the latter movement within the Democratic Party, however, the Republican draft movement came largely from the grassroots of the party. By January 23, 1948, the grassroots movement had successfully entered Eisenhower's name into every state holding a Republican presidential primary, and polls gave him a significant lead against all other contenders. With the first state primary approaching, Eisenhower was forced to make a quick decision. Stating that soldiers should keep out of politics, Eisenhower declined to run and requested that the grassroots draft movement cease its activities. After a number of failed efforts to get Eisenhower to reconsider, the organization disbanded, with the majority of its leadership endorsing the presidential campaign of the former Governor of Minnesota, Harold Stassen. With Eisenhower refusing to run, the contest for the Republican nomination was between Stassen, New York Governor Thomas E. Dewey, Senator Robert A. Taft from Ohio, California Governor Earl Warren, General Douglas MacArthur, and Senator Arthur H. Vandenberg from Michigan, the senior Republican in the Senate. Dewey, who had been the Republican nominee in 1944, was regarded as the frontrunner when the primaries began. Dewey was the acknowledged leader of the Republican Party's Eastern Establishment. In 1946 he had been re-elected governor of New York by the largest margin in state history. Dewey's handicap was that many Republicans disliked him on a personal level; he often struck observers as cold, stiff, and calculating. Taft was the leader of the Republican Party's conservative wing, which was strongest in the Midwest and parts of the South. Taft called for abolishing many New Deal welfare programs, which he felt were harmful to business interests, and he was skeptical of American involvement in foreign alliances such as the United Nations. Taft had two major weaknesses: He was a plodding, dull campaigner, and he was viewed by most party leaders as being too conservative and controversial to win a presidential election.

Both Vandenberg and Warren were highly popular in their home states, but each refused to campaign in the primaries, which limited their chances of winning the nomination. Their supporters, however, hoped that in the event of a Dewey-Taft-Stassen deadlock, the convention would turn to their man as a compromise candidate. General MacArthur, the famous war hero, was especially popular among conservatives. Since he was serving in Japan as the Supreme Commander of the Allied Powers occupying that nation, he was unable to campaign for the nomination. He did make it known, however, that he would accept the GOP nomination if it were offered to him, and some conservative Republicans hoped that by winning a primary contest he could prove his popularity with voters. They chose to enter his name in the Wisconsin primary. His candidacy was enthusiastically supported by William Randolph Hearst in all of his newspapers.  

The "surprise" candidate of 1948 was Stassen, a liberal from Minnesota. In 1938, Stassen had been elected governor of Minnesota at the age of 31; he resigned as governor in 1943 to serve in the wartime Navy. In 1945 he served on the committee that created the United Nations. Stassen was widely regarded as the most liberal of the Republican candidates, yet during the primaries he was criticized for being vague on many issues. Stassen stunned Dewey and MacArthur in the Wisconsin primary; Stassen's surprise victory virtually eliminated General MacArthur, whose supporters had made a major effort on his behalf. Stassen defeated Dewey again in the Nebraska primary, thus making him the new frontrunner. He then made the strategic mistake of trying to beat Taft in Ohio, Taft's home state. Stassen believed that if he could defeat Taft in his home state, Taft would be forced to quit the race and most of Taft's delegates would support him instead of Dewey. Taft defeated Stassen in his native Ohio, and Stassen earned the hostility of the party's conservatives. Even so, Stassen was still leading Dewey in the polls for the upcoming Oregon primary. Dewey, however, realized that losing another primary would end his chances at the nomination, and he decided to make an all-out effort in Oregon.

In April 1948, Dewey sent Paul Lockwood, one of his top aides, to build a strong grassroots organization in the state. Working with $150,000 sent by Dewey's powerful New York political organization (three times the previous record spent in an Oregon primary), Lockwood paid "for 126 billboards, hundreds of sixty-second radio spots on every station in the state, and half-hour broadcasts each noon...The daily Portland Oregonian carried five Dewey advertisements a day." Dewey also extensively campaigned in Oregon, spending three weeks in the state. He "invaded every hamlet, no matter how isolated, speaking at rural crossroads and shaking hands in hamburger stands. One journalist commented that Dewey was the greatest explorer of Oregon since Lewis and Clark."

Dewey also agreed to debate Stassen in Oregon on national radio. Held on May 17, 1948, it was the first-ever radio debate between presidential candidates. The sole issue of the debate concerned whether to outlaw the Communist Party of the United States. Stassen, despite his liberal reputation, argued in favor of outlawing the party, stating his belief that a network of Soviet-directed Communist spies "within the U.S. demanded immediate, and punitive, response...Why did Dewey oppose such a ban? Stassen wanted to know." "We must not coddle Communism with legality", Stassen insisted. Dewey - while criticizing Communist totalitarianism and Soviet actions in the Cold War - still forcefully argued against banning the Communist Party: "This outlawing idea is nothing new...for thousands of years despots have tortured, imprisoned, killed, and exiled their opponents, and their governments have always fallen into the dust." Dewey ended his turn in the debate by stating that "I am unalterably, wholeheartedly, and unswervingly against any scheme to write laws outlawing people because of their religious, political, social, or economic ideas. I am against it because it is a violation of the Constitution of the United States and the Bill of Rights...I am against it because I know from a great many years of experience in law enforcement that the proposal wouldn't work. Stripped to its naked essentials...this is nothing but the method of Hitler and Stalin. It is thought control...an attempt to beat down ideas with a club. It is a surrender of everything we believe in." Surveys showed that from 40 to 80 million people nationwide listened to the debate, and most observers rated Dewey as the winner. Four days after the debate, Dewey defeated Stassen in the Oregon primary. From this point forward, the New York governor had the momentum he needed to win his party's nomination for a second straight time.

Republican Convention 
The 1948 Republican National Convention was held in Philadelphia, Pennsylvania. It was the first presidential convention to be shown on national television. At this time, there were 27 television stations in full operation in the U.S. and an estimated 350,000 TV sets in the whole country. As the convention opened, Dewey was believed to have a large lead in the delegate count. His campaign managers, such as Herbert Brownell Jr., Edwin Jaeckle, and J. Russell Sprague, were "as skillful a group of operators as ever manipulated a convention...it was said at the convention that the Dewey forces "could have won even with Taft" as their candidate." His main opponent, Senator Taft, was hobbled by an ineffective campaign team that one writer called "bumblers", and another historian noted that Taft's campaign manager, Ohio Congressman Clarence J. Brown, "seemed no match for Herbert Brownell...while the Dewey forces were busy flattering delegates and hinting at promises of patronage, Brown was still worrying about such mundane matters as hotel rooms and seats in the gallery for his friends."

Taft and Stassen, Dewey's leading opponents, met in Taft's hotel suite to plan a "stop-Dewey" movement. A key obstacle soon developed, however, as both men refused to unite behind a single candidate to oppose Dewey: "The essence of their impasse was simple. Neither Stassen nor Taft hated Dewey enough to withdraw [in favor of the other], and neither man thought he could get his delegates to follow if he did." Instead, both Taft and Stassen, along with Senator Vandenberg, simply agreed to try to hold their own delegates in the hopes of preventing Dewey from obtaining a majority. This proved to be futile, as Dewey's efficient campaign team methodically gathered the remaining delegates they needed to win the nomination. Stassen tried to contact General Eisenhower to ask him to reconsider becoming a candidate, but Eisenhower "could not be reached." After the second round of balloting, Dewey was only 33 votes short of victory. Taft then called Stassen and urged him to withdraw from the race and endorse him as Dewey's main opponent. When Stassen refused, Taft wrote a concession statement and had it read to the convention at the start of the third ballot; at this point the other candidates also dropped out, and Dewey was then nominated unanimously by acclamation.

Dewey's campaign team originally wanted Illinois Governor Dwight Green to be his running mate, but the opposition of Colonel Robert R. McCormick, the powerful publisher of the Chicago Tribune, nixed his chances. According to journalist Jules Abels, Dewey managers Brownell, Sprague, and Jaeckle then appeared to offer the vice-presidential nomination to influential Indiana Congressman Charles Halleck, in exchange for Halleck delivering the entire Indiana delegation to Dewey. Halleck did so, but Dewey, who had not been present at the meeting between his managers and Halleck, decided to reject his candidacy, telling his aides "Halleck won't do." After Dewey told Halleck of his decision, Halleck "was first speechless with disbelief and then overcome with emotion." He told Dewey that "you're running out on the Eightieth Congress, and you'll be sorry!" Abels wrote that Dewey's decision to deny Halleck the vice-presidential bid "may have been a fateful one...Halleck with his forceful personality might have changed the tone of the Dewey campaign, and certainly the issue of the record of the GOP-controlled Eightieth Congress would have to have been met heads on." Instead, Dewey chose popular governor (and future Chief Justice) Earl Warren of California as his running mate. Following the convention, most political experts in the news media rated the Republican ticket as an almost-certain winner over the Democrats.

Progressive Party nomination 

Meanwhile, the Democratic Party fragmented. A new Progressive Party (the name had been used earlier by Theodore Roosevelt in 1912 and Robert M. La Follette in 1924) was created afresh in 1948, with the nomination of Henry A. Wallace, who had served as Secretary of Agriculture, Vice President of the United States, and Secretary of Commerce under Franklin D. Roosevelt. In 1946, President Truman fired Wallace as Secretary of Commerce when Wallace publicly opposed Truman's firm moves to counter the Soviet Union in the Cold War. Wallace's 1948 platform opposed the Cold War, including the Marshall Plan and Truman Doctrine. The Progressives proposed stronger government regulation and control of Big Business. They also campaigned to end discrimination against blacks and women, backed a minimum wage, and called for the elimination of the House Un-American Activities Committee, which was investigating the issue of communist spies within the government and labor unions. Wallace and his supporters charged that the Committee was violating the civil liberties of government workers and labor unions. The Progressives also generated a great deal of controversy because of the widespread belief that they were secretly controlled by Communists who were more loyal to the Soviet Union than the United States. Wallace himself denied being a Communist, but he repeatedly refused to disavow their support and, at one point, was quoted as saying that the "Communists are the closest thing to the early Christian martyrs." Walter Reuther, the president of the influential United Auto Workers union, strongly opposed Wallace's candidacy, stating that "people who are not sympathetic with democracy in America are influencing him." Philip Murray, the president of the Congress of Industrial Organizations (CIO), stated in April 1948 that "the Communist Party is directly responsible for the creation of the third party [Progressive Party] in the United States."

Wallace was also hurt when Westbrook Pegler, a prominent conservative newspaper columnist, revealed that Wallace as vice president had written coded letters discussing prominent leaders such as Franklin Roosevelt and Winston Churchill to his controversial Russian New Age spiritual guru Nicholas Roerich; the letters were nicknamed the "Guru letters." In his book Out of the Jaws of Victory, the journalist Jules Abels wrote: "Personalities were referred to by symbolic titles—Roosevelt was 'The Flaming One', Churchill 'The Roaring Lion', and Cordell Hull 'The Sour One'... some of the letters were signed 'Wallace', others 'Galahad'", the name that Roerich had assigned Wallace in his cult. This revelation—including direct quotes from the letters—led to much ridicule of Wallace in the national press. The Progressive Party Convention, which was also held in Philadelphia, was a highly contentious affair; several famous newspaper journalists, such as H. L. Mencken and Dorothy Thompson, publicly accused the Progressives of being covertly controlled by Communists. The party's platform was drafted by Lee Pressman, the convention secretary; he later admitted that he had been a member of the Communist party. John Abt served as legal counsel to the convention's permanent chairman, Albert Fitzgerald; he also testified years later that he was a Communist. Rexford Tugwell, a prominent liberal in President Franklin Roosevelt's New Deal, served as the Chairman of the party's platform committee. He became convinced that the party was being manipulated by Communists, and was "so heartsick about Communist infiltration of the party that he discussed . . . with his wife disaffiliating [from the party] the night before the convention" started. Tugwell later did disassociate himself from the Progressive Party and did not participate in Wallace's fall campaign. A number of other Progressive Party delegates and supporters would quit the party in protest over what they perceived as the undue influence Communists exerted over Wallace, including the prominent American socialist Norman Thomas. In the fall, Thomas would run as the Socialist Party presidential candidate to offer liberals a non-Communist alternative to Wallace.

Senator Glen H. Taylor from Idaho, an eccentric figure who was known as a "singing cowboy" and who had ridden his horse "Nugget" up the steps of the United States Capitol after winning election to the Senate in 1944, was named as Wallace's running mate. Although he was a member of the Democratic Party, Taylor accepted the Progressive Party's vice-presidential nomination, saying "I am not leaving the Democratic Party. It left me. Wall Street and the military have taken over the Democratic Party." After receiving the vice-presidential nomination, Taylor told reporters that there was a difference between "pink" Communists and "red" Communists. Taylor claimed that "pink" Communists would support the Wallace-Taylor ticket because they believed in a "peaceful revolution" to turn the government to left-wing beliefs, but "red" Communists would support the Republican ticket in the belief that they would cause another Great Depression, which would give Communists the chance to take over the government.

In the fall campaign the Wallace-Taylor ticket made a Southern tour, where both Wallace and Taylor insisted on speaking to racially integrated audiences, in defiance of Southern custom and law at the time. In several North Carolina cities Wallace was hit by a total of "twenty-seven eggs, thirty-seven tomatoes, six peaches, and two lemons." When he left the state he announced: "As Jesus Christ said, if at any time they will not listen to you willingly, then shake the dust off from your feet and go elsewhere." He ate only in unsegregated restaurants, traveled with a black secretary, and in Mississippi had to be escorted by police for protection. His aide Clark Foreman admitted that Wallace wanted to stir up controversy for the publicity it would receive in more liberal areas in the North and West. As the campaign progressed, however, Wallace's crowds thinned and his standing in the polls dropped. Wallace was hurt by the successful effort of labor unions to keep their members in the Democratic column, and by controversial statements from Progressives supporting "appeasement with Russia." Wallace himself attacked Winston Churchill as a "racist" and "imperialist", and Senator Taylor earned criticism for a speech in which he claimed that the "Nazis are running the US government. So why should Russia make peace with them? If I were a Russian . . . I would not agree to anything . . . we are aggressively preparing for war."

The Wallace-Taylor ticket finished in fourth place in the election, winning 1,157,328 votes (2.4%). This was slightly less than the States' Rights Party, but the Progressive Party received no electoral votes.

States' Rights Democratic Party nomination 

Southern Democrats had become increasingly disturbed over President Truman's support of civil rights, particularly following his executive order racially integrating the U.S. armed forces and a civil rights message he sent to Congress in February 1948. At the Southern Governor's Conference in Wakulla Springs, Florida, on February 6, Mississippi Governor Fielding Wright proposed the formation of a new third party to protect racial segregation in the South. On May 10, 1948, the governors of the eleven states of the former Confederacy, along with other high-ranking Southern officials, met in Jackson, Mississippi, to discuss their concerns about the growing civil rights movement within the Democratic Party. At the meeting, South Carolina Governor Strom Thurmond criticized President Truman for his civil rights agenda, and the governors discussed ways to oppose it.

The Southern Democrats who had walked out of the Democratic National Convention to protest the civil rights platform approved by the convention, and supported by Truman, promptly met at Municipal Auditorium in Birmingham, Alabama, on July 17, 1948, and formed yet another political party, which they named the States' Rights Democratic Party. More commonly known as the "Dixiecrats", the party's main goal was continuing the policy of racial segregation in the South and the Jim Crow laws that sustained it. Governor Thurmond, who had led the walkout, became the party's presidential nominee after the convention's initial favorite, Arkansas Governor Benjamin Laney, withdrew his name from consideration. Governor Wright of Mississippi received the vice-presidential nomination. The Dixiecrats had no chance of winning the election themselves, since they could not get on the ballot in enough states to win the necessary electoral votes. Their strategy was to take enough Southern states from Truman to force the election into the United States House of Representatives under the provisions of the Twelfth Amendment, where they could then extract concessions from either Truman or Dewey on racial issues in exchange for their support. Even if Dewey won the election outright, the Dixiecrats hoped that their defection would show that the Democratic Party needed Southern support in order to win national elections, and that this fact would weaken the pro-civil rights movement among Northern and Western Democrats. The Dixiecrats were weakened, however, when most Southern Democratic leaders (such as Governor Herman Talmadge of Georgia and "Boss" E. H. Crump from Tennessee) refused to support the party. Despite being an incumbent president, Truman was not placed on the ballot in Alabama.

In the states of Louisiana, Mississippi, Alabama, and South Carolina, the party was able to be labeled as the main Democratic Party ticket on the local ballots on election night. Outside of these four states, it was only listed as a third-party ticket.

Socialist Party nomination 

Although it had initially appeared that the Socialist Party would refrain from nominating its own candidate and instead endorse Wallace's run, policy differences and Wallace's refusal to publicly repudiate the support of communists caused them to break with the Progressive Party and nominate their own ticket. The party therefore nominated Norman Thomas, a five-time Socialist nominee and the former party chairman, as president, and Tucker P. Smith, an economics professor, as vice president.

Thomas debated Farrell Dobbs, the nominee of the Socialist Workers Party, during the general election. This was the first debate between general election presidential candidates. Edward A. Teichert, the nominee of the Socialist Labor Party of America, had challenged Thomas to a debate, but Teichert declined after Thomas asked for Dobbs to also be invited.

Christian Nationalist Party nomination 
This Party nominated Gerald L. K. Smith, a leader of the Share Our Wealth movement during the Great Depression, founder of the Christian Nationalist Crusade, and founder of the America First Party (1943) for which he was presidential candidate (1944).

General election

Fall campaign 

Given Truman's sinking popularity and the seemingly fatal three-way split in the Democratic Party, Dewey appeared unbeatable to the point where top Republicans believed that all their candidate had to do to win was to avoid major mistakes. Following this advice, Dewey carefully avoided risks and spoke in platitudes, avoiding controversial issues, and remained vague on what he planned to do as president, with speech after speech being nonpartisan and also filled with optimistic assertions or empty statements of the obvious, including the famous quote: "You know that your future is still ahead of you." An editorial in the Louisville Courier-Journal summed it up:
No presidential candidate in the future will be so inept that four of his major speeches can be boiled down to these historic four sentences: Agriculture is important. Our rivers are full of fish. You cannot have freedom without liberty. Our future lies ahead.

Another writer noted the "one broad issue that Dewey set forth in the campaign was unity...but [he] was oversold on an issue which had no visceral appeal to the average American. It was hard to understand what Dewey was driving at. Sometimes it seemed that he was asking Americans to achieve unity by being united behind him." On the other hand, Truman's campaign strategist, Clark Clifford, said that Truman's campaign was "pitched to four distinct interest groups - labor, the farmer, the Negro, and the consumer. Every move had these four interest groups in mind." Since he was trailing in the polls, Truman decided to adopt a slashing, no-holds-barred campaign. He ridiculed Dewey by name, criticized Dewey's refusal to address specific issues, and scornfully targeted the Republican-controlled 80th Congress with a wave of relentless and blistering partisan assaults. Truman claimed that "the Communists are rooting for a GOP victory because they know it would bring on another Great Depression." In several speeches, Truman stated that "GOP" actually stood for "gluttons of privilege", and said that Republicans were "princes of privilege" and "bloodsuckers with offices on Wall Street." He told one audience that "The Republicans have begun to nail the American consumer to the wall with spikes of greed." At the National Plowing Contest in Dexter, Iowa, Truman told 80,000 farmers in attendance that "this Republican Congress has already stuck a pitchfork in the farmer's back" to rapturous applause.

Truman nicknamed the Republican-controlled Congress as the "worst", "do-nothing" Congress, a remark which brought strong criticism from Republican Congressional leaders (such as Taft), but no comment from Dewey. In fact, Dewey rarely mentioned Truman's name during the campaign, which fit into his strategy of appearing to be above petty partisan politics. Under Dewey's leadership, the Republicans had enacted a platform at their 1948 convention that called for expanding Social Security, more funding for public housing, civil rights legislation, and promotion of health and education by the federal government. These positions were unacceptable to the conservative Congressional Republican leadership; Truman exploited this rift in the opposing party by calling a special session of Congress on "Turnip Day" (referring to an old piece of Missouri folklore about planting turnips in late July) and daring the Republican Congressional leadership to pass its own platform. The 80th Congress played into Truman's hands, delivering very little in the way of substantive legislation during this time. Truman simply ignored the fact that Dewey's policies were considerably more liberal than most of his fellow Republicans, and instead concentrated his fire against what he characterized as the conservative, obstructionist tendencies of the unpopular 80th Congress. Truman toured much of the nation with his fiery rhetoric, playing to large, enthusiastic crowds. "Give 'em hell, Harry" was a popular slogan shouted out at stop after stop along the tour. The polls and the pundits held that Dewey's lead was insurmountable and that Truman's efforts were for naught. Truman's own staff considered the campaign a last hurrah. Even Truman's own wife, Bess, had private doubts that her husband could win; the only person who appears to have considered Truman's campaign to be winnable was the president himself, who confidently predicted victory to anyone who would listen to him. Near the end of the campaign, Truman privately wrote a state-by-state electoral vote prediction and gave it to his aide, George Elsey. Truman believed that he would win the election with 340 electoral votes, to 108 for Dewey, 42 for Thurmond, and 37 marked doubtful (he accidentally left out four electoral votes).

In the final weeks of the campaign, American movie theaters agreed to play two short newsreel-like campaign films in support of the two major-party candidates: both had been created by its respective campaign organization. The Dewey film, shot professionally on an impressive budget, featured very high production values but somehow reinforced an image of the New York governor as cautious and distant. On the other hand, the Truman film, hastily assembled on virtually no budget by the perpetually cash-short Truman campaign, relied heavily on public-domain and newsreel footage of the president taking part in major world events and signing important legislation. Perhaps unintentionally, the Truman film visually reinforced an image of him as engaged and decisive. Years later, historian David McCullough cited the expensive but lackluster Dewey film and the far cheaper but more effective Truman film as important factors in determining the preferences of undecided voters. As the campaign drew to a close, the polls showed Truman was gaining: though Truman lost all nine of the Gallup Poll's post-convention surveys, Dewey's Gallup lead dropped from 17 points in late September to nine points in mid-October and just five points by the end of the month, just above the poll's margin of error. Although Truman was gaining momentum, most political analysts were reluctant to break with the conventional wisdom and say that a Truman victory was a serious possibility.  After 1948, pollsters would constantly test voters through election day.

On September 9, nearly two months before election day, pollster Elmo Roper announced "Thomas E. Dewey is almost as good as elected. [...] I can think of nothing duller or more intellectually barren than acting like a sports announcer who feels he must pretend he is witnessing a neck-and-neck race." Roper stopped polling voters until the final week before the election, when he took another poll. It showed "a slight shift to Truman; it still gave Dewey a heavy lead, however, so he decided not to hedge his bet." One poll showing strong Truman support in the rural Midwest was sponsored by the Staley Milling Company, who "polled farmers by giving them a choice of a donkey or an elephant on chicken feed sacks. When the results among 20,000 farmers showed up as fifty-four percent to forty-six percent for the donkey, the poll was abandoned."

When Dewey considered adopting a more aggressive stance after noticing that his crowds were dwindling, Herbert Brownell contacted 90 GOP state committeemen and committeewomen in all 48 states. With one exception, they "urged [Dewey] to press forward on the high road" his campaign had taken and to continue to ignore Truman's attacks. The sole exception was Kansas committeeman Harry Darby, who warned Dewey and his managers "that farmers were in a mutinous mood" and recommended that Dewey take a tougher and more aggressive stance. However, given that all the polls still showed Dewey leading, and no other committee member supported Darby, his advice was rejected.

In the campaign's final days, many newspapers, magazines, and political pundits were so confident of Dewey's impending victory they wrote articles to be printed the morning after the election speculating about Dewey's Presidency: Life magazine printed a large photo in its final edition before the election, entitled "Our Next President Rides by Ferryboat over San Francisco Bay," that showed Dewey and his staff riding across the city's harbor. Newsweek polled fifty experts, with all fifty predicting a Dewey win. Several well-known and influential newspaper columnists, such as Drew Pearson and Joseph Alsop, wrote columns to be printed the morning after the election speculating about Dewey's possible choices for his cabinet; the day before the election, Pearson wrote that any chance of a Truman victory was "impossible," and his column printed the day after the election stated that Pearson had "surveyed the closely-knit group around Tom Dewey who will take over the White House 86 days from now."

Walter Winchell reported that gambling odds were 15 to 1 against Truman. More than 500 newspapers, accounting for over 78% of the nation's total circulation, endorsed Dewey. Truman picked up 182 endorsements, accounting for just 10% of America's newspaper readership, being surpassed by Thurmond, who got the remaining 12% from many Southern papers. Alistair Cooke, the distinguished writer for the Manchester Guardian newspaper in the United Kingdom, published an article on the day of the election entitled "Harry S. Truman: A Study of a Failure." For its television coverage, NBC News had constructed a large cardboard model of the White House containing two elephants that would pop out when NBC announced Dewey's victory; since Truman's defeat was considered certain, no donkeys were placed in the White House model.

As Truman made his way to his hometown of Independence, Missouri, to await the election returns, some among his inner circle had already accepted other jobs, and not a single reporter traveling on his campaign train thought that he would win, while a number of prominent Republicans, anticipating serving in a Dewey Presidency, had already bought homes in Washington.

Results 

On election night, Dewey, his family, and campaign staff confidently gathered in the Roosevelt Hotel in New York City to await the returns. Truman, aided by the Secret Service, snuck away from reporters covering him in Kansas City and rode to nearby Excelsior Springs, Missouri. There, he took a room in the historic Elms Hotel, had dinner and a Turkish bath, and went to sleep. As the votes came in, Truman took an early lead that he never lost. The leading radio commentators, such as H. V. Kaltenborn of NBC, still confidently predicted that once the "late returns" came in Dewey would overcome Truman's lead and win. At midnight, Truman awoke and turned on the radio in his room; he heard Kaltenborn announce that while Truman was still ahead in the popular vote, he could not possibly win. At 4 a.m., Truman awoke again and heard on the radio that his popular-vote lead was now nearly two million votes, and that he was well ahead in the electoral vote. He told the Secret Service agents guarding him to drive him back to Kansas City, "because it looks as if we're in for another four years." For the rest of his life, Truman would gleefully mimic Kaltenborn's staccato voice predicting his defeat throughout that election night. Dewey, meanwhile, realized that he was in trouble when early returns from New England and New York showed him running well behind his expected vote total. He stayed up for the rest of the night and early morning analyzing the votes as they came in, and by 10:30 a.m., he was convinced he had lost; at 11:14 a.m., he sent a gracious telegram of concession to Truman.

The pro-Republican Chicago Daily Tribune, was so certain of Dewey's victory that on Tuesday afternoon, before any polls closed, it printed "DEWEY DEFEATS TRUMAN" as its banner headline for the following day. Part of the reason Truman's victory came as such a shock was because of uncorrected flaws in the emerging craft of public opinion polling. According to historian William Manchester, "many professional pollsters...believed in what some had come to call Farley's Law." James Farley, President Franklin Roosevelt's successful campaign manager in 1932 and 1936, had stated that, in his opinion, the great majority of voters decided which candidate to support during the political conventions. The fall campaigns, Farley believed, were simply "ineffective carnivals" that swayed few voters. In 1948 many pollsters, relying on Farley's Law, believed that the election was effectively over after the Republican and Democratic Conventions, and they discounted the impact of Truman's campaigning that fall.

Manchester noted that "Gallup's September 24 report foresaw 46.5% for Dewey to 38% for Truman. His last column, appearing in the Sunday papers two days before the election, showed Truman gaining sharply – to 44 percent – and the interviews on which it was based had been conducted two weeks earlier. The national mood was shifting daily, almost hourly." After the election, a study by the University of Michigan revealed that "14% of Truman's voters, or 3,374,800, had decided to vote for him in the last fortnight of the campaign." Gallup and Roper also did an analysis of the votes; they "learned that one voter in every seven (6,927,000), made up his mind in the last two weeks before the election. Of these, 75 percent picked Truman", which was more than his margin of victory over Dewey. "Using either the Michigan figures or Gallup-Roper's, one finds that some 3,300,000 fence-sitters determined the outcome of the race in its closing days – when Dewey's instincts were urging him to adopt Truman's hell-for-leather style and slug it out with him, and when he didn't because all the experts told him he shouldn't."

The key states in the 1948 election were Ohio, California, and Illinois. Truman won each of these states by less than 1 percentage point; they gave him a total of 78 electoral votes. Had Dewey carried all three states - which would have required a shift of just 29,000 votes - he would have won the election in the Electoral College despite losing the popular vote by 2.13 million votes (or 4.36%). If Dewey had won any two of the three, no nominee would have reached the 266 electoral votes required for election, and the Dixiecrats would have succeeded in their goal of forcing the election into the House of Representatives.

The extreme closeness of the vote in these three states was the major reason why Dewey waited until late on the morning of November 3 to concede defeat. Aside from Ohio, California, and Illinois, Truman carried Idaho by almost as narrow a margin, and Dewey himself countered with similarly narrow victories in New York (the nation's largest electoral prize at the time), his birth state of Michigan, and Maryland. But this was too little to give him the election. Dewey would always believe that he lost the election because he lost the rural vote in the Midwest, which he had won in 1944 (note the Kaltenborn predictions that Truman would joyously mock had taken for granted that the "country vote" would go to Dewey).

Truman's net vote totals in the twelve largest cities, which was around 1,481,000, had decreased by 750,000 from Roosevelt's results in the 1944 election, which was around 2,230,000.

Journalist Samuel Lubell found in his post-1948 survey of voters that Truman, not Dewey, seemed the safer, more conservative candidate to the "new middle class" that had developed over the previous 20 years. He wrote that "to an appreciable part of the electorate, the Democrats had replaced the Republicans as the party of prosperity" during and after the war. Lubell quoted a man who, when asked why he did not vote Republican after moving to the suburbs, answered "I own a nice home, have a new car and am much better off than my parents were. I've been a Democrat all my life. Why should I change?" Dewey's promise of a "great house cleaning" in Washington worried an Iowa minister who wanted to retain farm subsidies for parishioners; worried about the consequences of another depression, he voted Democratic for the first time in his church's history. Truman received a record number of Catholic votes, exceeding even the Catholic support of Al Smith in 1928, in part because Wallace drew leftists away from the Democrats.

Another reason for Dewey's surprise defeat was his complacent, distant approach to the campaign, and his failure to respond to Truman's attacks. Journalist Jules Abels wrote that "the election was not thrown away by indifference or lack of effort. Preparation and more preparation had always been the distinguishing characteristic of Dewey and his team throughout his career...The truth is that Dewey's campaign was the result not of careless, but too careful and painstaking, calculation. The Dewey campaign was frozen into inertia not because it had been underthought, but because it had been overthought."

Other possible factors for Truman's victory included his aggressive, populist campaign style; broad public approval of Truman's foreign policy, notably the Berlin Airlift of that year; and widespread dissatisfaction with the institution Truman labeled as the "do-nothing, good-for-nothing 80th Republican Congress." In addition, after suffering a relatively severe recession in 1946 and 1947 (in which real GDP dropped by 12% and inflation went over 15%), the economy began recovering throughout 1948. The year 1948 was a banner year for the Democrats, as they not only retained the presidency but also recaptured both houses of Congress. It was also an unprecedented fifth consecutive presidential victory for the party, thus continuing what remains the only winning streak of more than two presidential elections by the Democratic Party since the Civil War. Since 1948, there has been only one streak of three consecutive presidential victories by any party (in that case, by the Republicans). The two largest third parties did not hurt Truman nearly as much as expected, as Thurmond's Dixiecrats carried only four Southern states, fewer than predicted. The civil rights platform helped Truman win large majorities among black voters in the populous Northern and Midwestern states, and may well have made the difference for Truman in states such as Illinois and Ohio. Wallace's Progressives received only 2.4% of the national popular vote, well below their expected vote total and slightly less than the Dixiecrats, and Wallace did not take as many liberal votes from Truman as many political pundits had predicted. Some analysts, including author Zachary Karabell, have even argued that the separate candidacies of Wallace and Thurmond were beneficial to Truman by removing the separate taints of communism and racism from the Democratic Party.

The split of the Democratic party, while failing to hold back Truman, did hold Truman back in several narrow states. Had the Wallace and Thurmond vote been in the Democratic column, Truman would have won all the Thurmond states (Louisiana, Mississippi, Alabama, and South Carolina), and the Wallace vote would have flipped Michigan, Maryland and New York into Truman's states. Winning these states would have put Truman at 416 electoral votes to Dewey's reduced 115 electoral votes. This still would have been a decline of Democratic electoral votes since 1940 but percentage wise Truman would have gotten 54.33% of the popular vote, an increase of 0.94% from Roosevelt's last victory.

This was the last election until 1996 in which the Democrats won Arizona and the last until 1964 in which they won California, Colorado, Florida, Idaho, Iowa, Montana, Ohio, Oklahoma, Tennessee, Utah, Virginia, Washington, Wisconsin, and Wyoming. It was also the last election until 1964 in which South Carolina did not vote for the official Democratic nominee. Thurmond's 2.4% is the lowest popular vote percentage for a candidate who won all of a state's electoral votes. The 1948 presidential election contrasted with other elections across the world during this period, for Truman was a war leader who managed to win re-election (Churchill and De Gaulle both left office shortly after the end of the war). This was the last Presidential election, as of 2022, in which the Democratic candidate won Texas and the Republican candidate won New York.

Results by state

Close states 
Margin of victory less than 1% (138 electoral votes):
Ohio, 0.24% (7,107 votes)
California, 0.44% (17,865 votes) (tipping point state for Truman victory)
Indiana, 0.80% (13,246 votes)
Illinois, 0.84% (33,612 votes) (tipping point state for Dewey victory)
New York, 0.98% (60,959 votes)

Margin of victory less than 5% (131 electoral votes):
Delaware, 1.28% (1,775 votes)
Maryland, 1.39% (8,293 votes)
Connecticut, 1.64% (14,457 votes)
Michigan, 1.67% (35,147 votes)
Iowa, 2.73% (28,362 votes)
Idaho, 2.73% (5,856 votes)
Nevada, 3.11% (1,934 votes)
Oregon, 3.39% (17,757 votes)
Pennsylvania, 4.01% (149,771 votes)
Wyoming, 4.35% (4,407 votes)
New Jersey, 4.39% (85,669 votes)
Wisconsin, 4.41% (56,351 votes)
South Dakota, 4.80% (11,998 votes)

Margin of victory between 5% and 10% (59 electoral votes):
Colorado, 5.35% (27,574 votes)
New Hampshire, 5.75% (13,304 votes)
Virginia, 6.85% (28,716 votes)
Nebraska, 8.31% (40,609 votes)
North Dakota, 8.76% (19,327 votes)
Utah, 8.96% (24,749 votes)
Kansas, 9.02% (71,137 votes)
Washington, 9.93% (89,850 votes)
Montana, 9.94% (22,301 votes)
Arizona, 9.97% (17,654 votes)

Statistics

Counties with Highest Percent of Vote (Democratic)
 Duval County, Texas 96.52%
 Greene County, North Carolina 96.45%
 King County, Texas 95.85%
 Bertie County, North Carolina 95.71%
 Martin County, North Carolina 95.53%

Counties with Highest Percent of Vote (Republican)
 Jackson County, Kentucky 86.31%
 Sevier County, Tennessee 84.11%
 Johnson County, Tennessee 82.98%
 Grant County, West Virginia 80.83%
 Lincoln County, Maine 80.47%

Counties with Highest Percent of Vote (Dixiecrat)
 Choctaw County, Alabama 98.83%
 Wilcox County, Alabama 98.81%
 Bullock County, Alabama 98.76%
 Edgefield County, South Carolina 98.20%
 Monroe County, Alabama 97.86%

Results in major cities (from the top 100 by the 1940 Census)

See also 
 Party conventions:
 1948 Republican National Convention (Philadelphia: June 21–25, 1948)
 1948 Democratic National Convention (Philadelphia: July 12–14, 1948)
 Dixiecrat National Convention (Birmingham: July 17, 1948)
 1948 Progressive National Convention (Philadelphia: July 23–25, 1948)
 History of the United States (1945–1964)
 1948 United States House of Representatives elections
 1948 United States Senate elections
 Second inauguration of Harry S. Truman
 2016 United States presidential election
 Dewey Defeats Truman

Notes

References

Further reading 
 Abels, Jules. Out of the Jaws of Victory. New York: Henry Holt and Company (1959)
 Baime, Albert J. Dewey Defeats Truman: The 1948 Election and the Battle for America's Soul (Houghton Mifflin, 2020).

 
 
 Busch, Andrew E. Truman's Triumphs: The 1948 Election and the Making of Postwar America. Lawrence, KS: University Press of Kansas, 2012.
 Cohodas, Nadine. Strom Thurmond & the Politics of Southern Change (1995)
 Devine, Thomas W. Henry Wallace's 1948 Presidential Campaign and the Future of Postwar Liberalism Chapel Hill, NC: University of North Carolina Press; 2013.
 
 Divine, Robert A. Foreign policy and U.S. presidential elections, 1940-1948 (1974) online pp. 167–276 on 1948.
 
 Frederickson, Kari. The Dixiecrat Revolt and the End of the Solid South, 1932–1968 (2001) online
 

 Heersink, Boris, and Brenton D. Peterson. "Truman defeats Dewey: The effect of campaign visits on election outcomes." Electoral Studies 49 (2017): 49-64. online
 Johnstone, Andrew , and Andrew Priest, eds.  US Presidential Elections and Foreign Policy: Candidates, Campaigns, and Global Politics from FDR to Bill Clinton (2017) pp 61-81. online

 Jonas, Frank H. “The 1948 Elections in Utah.” Western Political Quarterly 2#1 1949, pp. 124–27. online
 

 Karlin, Jules Alexander. “The 1948 Elections in Montana.” Western Political Quarterly 2#1 1949, pp. 109–13. online
 Kelso, Paul. “The 1948 Elections in Arizona.” Western Political Quarterly 2#1 1949, pp. 92–96. online
 Kirby, Alec. " 'A Major Contender': Harold Stassen and the Politics of American Presidential Nominations." Minnesota History 55.4 (1996): 150-165.

 Manchester, William. (1975). The Glory and the Dream: A Narrative History of America, 1932–1972. New York: Bantam Books. online
 Martin, Boyd A. “The 1948 Elections in Idaho.” Western Political Quarterly 2#1 1949, pp. 105–08. online
 Mosteller, Frederick. "Why Did Dewey Beat Truman in the Pre-election Polls of 1948?." in The Pleasures of Statistics (Springer, New York, 2010) pp. 5-17.

 
 

 
 Ross, Irwin. The Loneliest Campaign: The Truman Victory of 1948. New York: New American Library, 1968.
 
 Schumacher, Waldo. “The 1948 Elections in Oregon.” Western Political Quarterly 2#1 1949, pp. 121–23. online

 Sitkoff, Harvard. "Harry Truman and the Election of 1948: The Coming of Age of Civil Rights in American Politics", Journal of Southern History Vol. 37, No. 4 (Nov. 1971), pp. 597–616. .
 
 Titus, Charles H., and Charles R. Nixon. “The 1948 Elections in California.” Western Political Quarterly 2#1 1949, pp. 97–102. online
 Topping, Simon. " 'Never argue with the Gallup Poll': Thomas Dewey, Civil Rights and the Election of 1948." Journal of American Studies 38.2 (2004): 179-198. online
 Tuttle, Daniel W. “The 1948 Elections in Wyoming.” Western Political Quarterly, 2#1 1949, pp. 132–34. online
 Webster, Donald H. “The 1948 Elections in Washington.” Western Political Quarterly 2#1 1949, pp. 128–31. online

Primary sources 

 Gallup, George H. ed. The Gallup Poll, Volume One 1935–1948 (1972) statistical reports on each poll online
 
 
 Chester, Edward W  A guide to political platforms (1977) online
 Porter, Kirk H. and Donald Bruce Johnson, eds. National party platforms, 1840-1964 (1965) online 1840-1956

External links 

 1948 popular vote by counties
 1948 State-by-state Popular vote
 Election of 1948 in Counting the Votes
"Journeys; Give 'em Hell, Harry! The Truman-Dewey Campaign of 1948," 1980-10-10, The Walter J. Brown Media Archives & Peabody Awards Collection at the University of Georgia, American Archive of Public Broadcasting

 
Presidency of Harry S. Truman
Harry S. Truman
Strom Thurmond
Presidential election